Lienardia is a genus of sea snails, marine gastropod mollusks in the family Clathurellidae.

Species

Lienardia acrolineata Fedosov, 2011
Lienardia armstrongi (G. Nevill & H. Nevill, 1875)
Lienardia biplicata (Melvill, 1906)
Lienardia caelata (Garrett, 1873)
Lienardia calathiscus (Melvill & Standen, 1896)
Lienardia cardinalis (Reeve, 1845)
Lienardia cincta (Dunker, 1871)
Lienardia coccinea (Anton, 1838)
Lienardia comideleuca (Melvill & Standen, 1903)
Lienardia compta (Reeve, 1845)
Lienardia corticea Hedley, 1922
Lienardia cosmia Winckworth, 1940
Lienardia crassicostata (Pease, 1860)
Lienardia crebrilirata (E. A. Smith, 1884)
Lienardia cremonilla (Melvill & Standen, 1895)
Lienardia crosseanum (Hervier, 1896)
Lienardia curculio (Nevill & Nevill, 1869)
Lienardia disconicum (Hervier, 1896)
Lienardia ecprepes Melvill, 1927
Lienardia exilirata Rehder, 1980
Lienardia exquisita (Nevill & Nevill, 1875)
Lienardia fallaciosa Hedley, 1922
Lienardia fallax (Nevill & Nevill, 1875)
Lienardia falsaria Hedley, 1922
Lienardia farsilis Hedley, 1922
Lienardia fatima (Thiele, 1925)
Lienardia fuscolineolata Kuroda & Oyama, 1971
Lienardia gaidei (Hervier, 1896)
Lienardia giliberti (Souverbie in Souverbie & Montrouzier, 1874)
Lienardia gracilis Hedley, 1922
Lienardia grandiradula Fedosov, 2011
Lienardia gravelyi Winckworth, 1940
Lienardia idiomorpha (Hervier, 1897)
Lienardia immaculata (E. A. Smith, 1876)
Lienardia innocens (Thiele, 1925)
Lienardia koyamai Bozzetti, 2007
Lienardia lischkeana (Pilsbry, 1904)
Lienardia marchei Jousseaume, 1884
Lienardia mighelsi Iredale & Tomlin, 1917
Lienardia multicolor Fedosov, 2011
Lienardia multinoda Hedley, 1922
Lienardia nigrotincta (Montrouzier in Souverbie & Montrouzier, 1873)
Lienardia obtusicostata (E. A. Smith, 1882)
Lienardia periscelina Hedley, 1922
Lienardia peristernioides Schepman, 1913
Lienardia perplexa (Nevill & Nevill, 1875)
Lienardia planilabrum (Reeve, 1846)
Lienardia pulchripicta (Melvill & Standen, 1901)
Lienardia punctilla Hedley, 1922
Lienardia purpurata (Souverbie, 1860)
Lienardia ralla Hedley, 1922
Lienardia rhodacme (Melvill & Standen, 1896)
Lienardia rigida (Hinds, 1843)
Lienardia roseangulata Fedosov, 2011
Lienardia rosella Hedley, 1922
Lienardia roseocincta (W. R. B. Oliver, 1915)
Lienardia roseotincta (Montrouzier in Souverbie & Montrouzier, 1872)
Lienardia rubida (Hinds, 1843)
Lienardia rugosa (Mighels, 1845)
Lienardia semilineata (Garrett, 1873)
Lienardia siren (E. A. Smith, 1904)
Lienardia spengleri Stahlschmidt, 2015
Lienardia strombilla (Hervier, 1896)
Lienardia tagaroae Fedosov, 2011
Lienardia thalera (Melvill & Standen, 1896)
Lienardia totopotens Rosenberg & Stahlschmidt, 2011
Lienardia tricolor (Brazier, 1876)
Lienardia vadososinuata Nomura & Niino, 1940
Lienardia vultuosa (Reeve, 1845)

Species brought into synonymy
 Subgenus Lienardia (Hemilienardia) Boettger, 1895: synonym of Hemilienardia O. Boettger, 1895
 Subgenus Lienardia (Lienardia): synonym of Lienardia Jousseaume, 1883
 Lienardia (Lienardia) rubida (Hinds, 1843): synonym of Lienardia rubida (Hinds, 1843)
 Lienardia apiculata (Montrouzier in Souverbie & Montrouzier, 1864): synonym of Hemilienardia apiculata (Montrouzier, 1864)
 Lienardia balteata (Pease, 1860): synonym of Hemilienardia balteata (Pease, 1860)
 Lienardia calcicincta (Melvill & Standen, 1895): synonym of Hemilienardia calcicincta (Melvill & Standen, 1895)
 Lienardia chrysoleuca Melvill, 1923: synonym of Hemilienardia chrysoleuca (Melvill, 1923) (original combination)
 Lienardia ecprepes Melvill, 1927: synonym of Hemilienardia ecprepes (Melvill, 1927) (original combination)
 Lienardia fenestrata (Melvill, 1898): synonym of Hemilienardia fenestrata (Melvill, 1898)
 Lienardia goubini (Hervier, 1896): synonym of Hemilienardia goubini (Hervier, 1896)
 Lienardia granulifera Schepman, 1913: synonym of Glyphostoma granulifera (Schepman, 1913) (original combination)
 Lienardia grayi (Reeve, 1845): synonym of Clathurella grayi (Reeve, 1845)
 Lienardia hadfieldi (Melvill & Standen, 1895): synonym of Pseudodaphnella hadfieldi (Melvill & Standen, 1895)
 Lienardia hersilia (Hedley, 1922): synonym of Hemilienardia hersilia Hedley, 1922
 Lienardia homochroa (Hedley, 1922): synonym of Hemilienardia homochroa Hedley, 1922
 Lienardia malleti (Récluz, 1852): synonym of Hemilienardia malleti (Récluz, 1852)
 Lienardia morsura (Hedley, 1899): synonym of Thetidos morsura Hedley, 1899
 Lienardia nigrocincta (Souverbie & Montrouzier, 1873): synonym of Lienardia nigrotincta (Montrouzier in Souverbie & Montrouzier, 1873)
 Lienardia obockensis Jousseaume, 1888: synonym of Cronia obockensis (Jousseaume, 1888) (original combination)
 Lienardia ocellata Jousseaume, 1883: synonym of Hemilienardia ocellata (Jousseaume, 1883) (original combination)
 Lienardia purpurascens (Dunker, 1871): synonym of Hemilienardia purpurascens (Dunker, 1871)
 Lienardia rubicunda (Gould, 1860): synonym of Hemilienardia rubicunda (Gould, 1860)
 Lienardia thyridota (Melvill & Standen, 1896): synonym of Hemilienardia thyridota (Melvill & Standen, 1896)

References

 Jousseaume F. (1883). Diagnose d'un nouveau genre de pleurotomidé; Bulletin de la Société Zoologique de France. 8: xl-xli
 Jousseaume F. (1884). Description de mollusques nouveaux. Bulletin de la Société Zoologique de France. 9: 169-192, pl. 4
 Fedosov, A., 2011. Five new species of the genus Lienardia (Conidae: Gastropoda) from the shallow waters of central Philippines. Ruthenica 21(2): 123-135

External links
 
 Tröndlé, J. E. A. N., and Michel Boutet. "Inventory of marine molluscs of French Polynesia." Atoll Research Bulletin (2009)

 
Gastropod genera